West Harting Down SSSI is a  biological Site of Special Scientific Interest  west of South Harting in West Sussex. It is part of the  West Harting Down, which is managed by Forestry England.

This is mainly mature yew forest on the chalk of the South Downs. There are also areas of chalk grassland with flora such as rock rose, carnation sedge, perforate St John’s wort and salad burnet, with grasses such as red fescue, tor-grass and common bent.

The Sussex Border Path runs through West Harting Down close to the SSSI.

References

Sites of Special Scientific Interest in West Sussex